Amparo is one of four subbarrios in barrio Universidad in the municipality of San Juan, Puerto Rico.

References

Universidad, San Juan, Puerto Rico
Municipality of San Juan